Two ships of the Royal Navy have borne the name HMS Verulam, probably after Francis Bacon, who was Baron Verulam, or other holders of the baronetage or earldom of Verulam:

  was an Admiralty V-class destroyer launched in 1917 and sunk in 1919.
  was a V-class destroyer launched in 1943.  She was converted into a Type 15 fast anti-submarine frigate between 1951 and 1952, and was sold in 1972.

References
 

Veralum